The Wildparty Sheiks were an American band based in New York City, from approximately the mid-1990s until 2002. They specialized in music originally performed by African-American musicians or Caucasians in blackface in the minstrel genre and related works, primarily from the early twentieth century. Each member of the band assumed a 'Sheik' pseudonym and they often played in costumes, such as Shriner-esque suits and fezzes.

Band lineup
The band's lineup was:

Album
In 2002, the band released an eponymous CD on 7th Room Records (#001) with the following tracks, all covers, crediting the original artist and date:

Track list
"My Money Never Runs Out" - Banjo Joe (Gus Cannon) 1927
"Loan Me Your Heart" - Papa Charlie Jackson 1929
"You Shall" - Frank Stokes 1927
"Take Those Lips Away" - Doc Roberts and Asa Martin 1928
"What Is It That Tastes Like Gravy" - Tampa Red and Georgia Tom 1929
"Can't Be Bothered With No Sheik" - Rosa Henderson 1931
"Boot It Boy" - Tampa Red and Frankie "Half Pint" Jaxon 1929
"Lady Quit Her Husband Onexpectingly" - Tub Jug Washboard Band 1928
"Old Jim Canaan" - Robert Wilkins 1935
"Dallas Rag" - Coley Jones and the Dallas String Band 1927
"O Tierra Del Sol" - (a.k.a. "Canción Mixteca". Mexican Traditional)
"Gonna Tip Out Tonight" - Simmie Dooley and Pink Anderson 1928

Bliss Blood of The Moonlighters provided guest vocals on "Can't Be Bothered With No Sheik" and the disc contained a bonus track accessible only by computer, which was a cover of the explicit version of "Shave 'Em Dry" as recorded by Lucille Bogan in 1935.

Band dissolution
The band effectively dissolved with the departure of lead singer Gresham for an extended trip to London. He has since returned to New York City and performed solo. Gresham is also known to have an extensive collection of Edison Cylinders, an early form of musical recording.

References

American experimental musical groups